Bushrode is a surname. Notable people with the surname include:

 John Bushrode (1612–1684), English merchant and politician
 Richard Bushrode (1576–1628), English haberdasher and merchant adventurer

See also
 Bushrod (disambiguation)